Majid Noormohammadi (born September 16, 1978) is an Iranian Football player who currently plays for Padideh Shandiz in Azadegan League.

Professional
Noormohammadi had played for Zob Ahan from 2010 to 2011.

Club Career Statistics
Last Update  10 May 2013 

 Assist Goals

References
 

1978 births
Living people
Iranian footballers
F.C. Aboomoslem players
Rah Ahan players
Shahr Khodro F.C. players
Persian Gulf Pro League players
Association football midfielders
People from Babol
Sportspeople from Mazandaran province